The Daughter of MacGregor is a 1916 American silent film produced by Famous Players Film Company and distributed by Paramount. It was directed by Sidney Olcott with Valentine Grant, his wife who wrote the scenario.

Cast
Valentine Grant - Jean MacGregor
Sidney Mason - Winston, the English
Arda La Croix - Donald MacGregor
Helen Lindroth - Mrs McGrim
Daniel Pennell - Bull Grogan
Edwards Davis - Robert MacPherson
Lady the Dog - Jean's companion

Production notes
The film was shot in Florida and Canada.
Working title: Jean O'the Heather.

External links

The Daughter of MacGregor website dedicated to Sidney Olcott

1916 films
American silent feature films
Films directed by Sidney Olcott
1916 comedy-drama films
1910s English-language films
American black-and-white films
1910s American films
Silent American comedy-drama films